Burchinal is an unincorporated community and census-designated place in Cerro Gordo County, Iowa, United States. As of the 2010 census, its population was 40.

Demographics

History
Burchinal's population was 22 in 1902.

Notes

Census-designated places in Cerro Gordo County, Iowa
Census-designated places in Iowa